Nerrina is a suburb of Ballarat, Victoria, Australia on the north-eastern rural-urban fringe of the city,  east of the Central Business District.

Nerrina is a semi-rural suburb with a very small township and commercial area. It is located on the foothills of the Brown Hill range and straddles both sides of the Western Freeway.

History
Historically, this area was known as Nerrena (named after the Nerrena Creek) and then Little Bendigo (after Bendigo, Victoria) . Little Bendigo Post Office opened on 1 June 1862, was renamed Nerrina in 1881 and closed in 1971.

Education 
The local primary school is Little Bendigo Primary School.

References

Suburbs of Ballarat
1862 establishments in Australia